Palmview High School is a public senior high school in the La Homa census-designated place in unincorporated Hidalgo County, Texas, with a Mission postal address, and a part of the La Joya Independent School District.
Palmview is a Texas UIL Division 5A high school named after the city of Palmview. The school is home to students that live on the east side of La Joya ISD.

Palmview High serves sections of Alton, Mission, and Palmview, as well as parts of the census-designated places of Doffing, La Homa, Palmview South, Perezville, and West Sharyland.

Foundation
Due to increasing population in the area, the school district, which formerly had only one high school, had to be split into three separate high schools. The 2008–2009 school year became the inaugural year for Palmview High School, and it was classified as a 6A school.

Administration

Athletics

Lobo Football
The Palmview Lobos share their field with La Joya Coyotes and Juarez-Lincoln Huskies at La Joya Stadium, a 12,500-seating capacity stadium which opened in 2000. The lobos made it to playoffs in 2014 for the first time and also became bi-district champs.

Lady Lobo Basketball
The Lady Lobos are coached by Anisa Reyna and assisted by Jose Reyna, along with many other staff members who are allocated positions on the Lady Lobos Basketball staff. The Lady Lobos made the playoffs for the first time in school history in 2015.

Other sports
Baseball
Golf
Softball
Soccer
Swimming
Track and field
Volleyball
Weightlifting
Wrestling
Cross country running
public speaking

Fine arts

Palmview’s Lobo theatre

Palmview Lobo Marching Band
The Palmview Lobo Band marches to the motto "The Pride of the Pack". The band has earned consecutive Sweepstakes Awards since its start as a new band program. The Lobo Band won the USSBA Group IV A State Championship in 2008. In 2014 the band advanced to the 6A Area G Marching Contest Finals. In addition, the band has earned  "firsts" awards in the district: the first 4-year All state band student in the district; 2 US Army All American Marching Band Members, Winterguard State Championship.

Palmview High School Choir

Mariachi "Lobos", Grupo Folklorico "Ozomatili", & Conjunto "La Tradicion"

Other Clubs/Organizations

The Lobo Times, Palmview High School's newspaper
Palmview National Honor Society
Palmview Media Society
Palmview Rubies (Dance/Drill Team)
Palmview Orchestra
H.O.S.A. (Health Occupations Students of America)
S.W.A.T. (Students With A Testimony)
Lobos Computer Science Team
Palmview HS Reading Club
Gear Up
GO Center
JROTC
F.F.A. (Future Farmers of America)
Cosmetology
Palmview High School Student Council
Palmview High School Math Club
Hispanic National Honor Society
Palmview High School Senior Class
G-FORCE

New traditions

Alma mater
Palmview's school song, "Alma Mater", uses the music of La Joya High School's original Alma Mater.

Texas Fight
Palmview's fight song, "Texas Fight", is the University of Texas fight song.

References

Educational institutions established in 2008
La Joya Independent School District high schools
2008 establishments in Texas